Sandy Herbert also known as "Jack Herbert" was an Australian professional rugby league footballer who played in the 1940s and 1950s. He played for Manly-Warringah in the NSWRL competition.

Playing career
Herbert made his first grade debut for Manly-Warringah in 1948. Between 1948 and 1950, Manly struggled towards the bottom of the table.

In 1951, Manly finished second on the table and reached their first finals campaign. Manly went on to reach the 1951 NSWRL grand final against South Sydney. Herbert played at second-row as Souths comprehensively beat Manly 42–14 in the final which was played at the Sydney Sports Ground. At the time this was the highest scoring grand final since 1908. Herbert retired from rugby league following the conclusion of the 1953 season.

References

Manly Warringah Sea Eagles players
Rugby league second-rows
Year of birth missing
Year of death missing
Place of death missing
Place of birth missing